Cross-country skiing at the 2011 Asian Winter Games was held at the Biathlon and Cross-Country Ski Complex in Almaty, Kazakhstan. The twelve events were scheduled for January 31 – February 6, 2011.

Schedule

Medalists

Men

Women

Medal table

Participating nations
A total of 44 athletes from 7 nations competed in cross-country skiing at the 2011 Asian Winter Games:

References

Men's Sprint
Men's Team Sprint
Men's 10km
Men's 15km
Men's 30km
Men's Relay
Women's Sprint
Women's Team Sprint
Women's 5km
Women's 10km
Women's 15km
Women's Relay

External links
Official website

 
Asian Winter Games
2011 Asian Winter Games events
2011